The TU family of small inline-four piston engines by PSA Peugeot Citroën were introduced in 1986 and used in the Peugeot and Citroën range of cars. It was first installed in the Citroën AX in October 1986, replacing the X family, although it shared many components with its predecessor. The TU is available in either petrol or a naturally aspirated diesel variant, the latter called TUD.

The TU engine is distantly related to the older X-Type engine - sharing a similar overhead camshaft architecture, but the key differences are the belt driven camshaft (the X is chain driven), and that the TU is mounted in a conventional upright position with a separate, end-on mounted transmission and unequal length drive shafts. The X engine, by comparison, had an integral transmission mounted on the side of the crankcase (giving rise to its popular nickname the "suitcase engine"), sharing a common oil supply and was mounted almost lying flat on its side within the car.

The TU engine is/was used in the following cars:
Citroën: AX, Saxo, C2, C3, C4, BX, ZX, Xsara, C15, Nemo and Berlingo. Peugeot: 106, 205, 206, 207, 309, 306, 307, 405, Bipper, Partner and Hoggar, the Iranian Peugeot 405 and Peugeot Pars TU5 as well as and IKCO Runna.
 

The TUD engine was only used in 11 cars of which 6 were non-PSA models: the Citroën AX, Citroën Saxo, Citroën Xsara; Peugeot 106, Rover Metro/100-series, Nissan Micra, Maruti Suzuki Zen D/Di and Maruti Suzuki Esteem D/Di and IKCO Samand, and the Tata Indigo 1.4 TD. The Tata's is a smaller version of the TUD engine, based on the 1.5D.

PSA has now stopped production of original TU engines, although EC engines, closely related to the TU5 unit, are still in production for emerging markets such as China and Russia and available in  1.6 , 1.8 and 2.0 liter versions.

TU9

The TU9 was the entry-level version, used in a variety of cars including the Citroën AX, Saxo, Peugeot 205 and 106. Production was stopped in the Citroën Saxo and Peugeot 106 with the introduction of Euro III in 2001. Early versions of this engine suffered premature piston failure which were of a special fuel-saving low-friction design. Symptoms were piston slap, especially with a cold engine, excessive oil consumption and exhaust smoke. PSA repaired the affected vehicles under warranty. This involved fitting a revised piston design and replacement liners.

TU1

The introduction of Euro III led to the adoption of multi point injection, but power remained the same (although there was a small torque increase). This engine was the entry-level option in the Citroën C2 and C3 and Peugeot 206.

TU2
There are two engines in this series, both developed for competition use, the first is carburettor fed (TU24) based on the TU1 and the second has electronic fuel injection (TU2) based on the TU3.

Power was initially , powering the Citroën AX Sport using Solex carburettors, but a slightly more powerful version of the TU24 was developed for the Peugeot 205 Rallye with a longer intake manifold and slightly larger venturi size in the Weber carburetors. 

This version in the 106 Rallye uses the taller TU3 aluminium block, different con rod lengths and pistons. The aluminium heads also differ slightly in port location, size and shape with different camshafts. The valve sizes are very slightly different with the TU24 being  Inlet /  Exhaust. TU2J2 being  Inlet and  Exhaust with slightly thinner valve stems.

TU3

This engine has been one of the most used by the PSA Group, with applications in superminis, compacts and midsize cars, including a stint in competition use in the Citroën AX GT Cup and the Citroën AX GTI Cup, held in many European countries throughout the early 1990s in both circuit racing and rallying.

In its early years, it was available with either a single or double barrel carburettor, with fuel injection introduced in 1990 for the AX GTI and 106 XSi, capable of delivering  at 6600 rpm. The carburettor versions gave way to fuel injection in 1992, while the sports version was retired in 1996.

ET3

A DOHC 16-valve version of the 1360 cc TU3 with variable valve timing was introduced in 2004 with the Peugeot 206 Quiksilver Edition. However, this version was named ET3, possibly as a prelude for the new PSA/BMW Prince engine family.

TU5

It was initially available in 8- and 16-valve configuration, but only the DOHC 16V option remains. The block is made of cast iron and the head is aluminium. The TU5 has been used in motorsports by both Citroën and Peugeot. This engine (JP+ version) was also installed in the Yugo Florida from 2002 until 2008.

The latest application is in the Citroën C-Elysée and Peugeot 301 where it is renamed "EC5". For the Chinese market the engine is named N6A 10FXA3A PSA and produces .

TU5 JP+ (NFV) and TU5 JP/L4 (NFT) are almost same engines, but with slight differences.
TUG 525

TUD3 and TUD5

The TUD was the diesel variant. An indirect injection diesel with mechanical pump (Bosch or Lucas variants depending on model and year). It initially used the alloy cylinder casings of the TU3 with stronger wet liners. This  was thus called TUD3. This engine was particularly prone to early head gasket failure, a problem that was not completely resolved with the introduction of the TUD5 engine with a more rigid cast iron block. Besides a number of applications in the PSA Group's supermini models (AX, Saxo, 106) and Citroën Xsara, it was sold to other automakers who did not possess small diesel engines, such as India's Maruti (who installed it in their Esteem and Zen) and the Rover Metro from 1993 until the end of production in 1997. It also powered the diesel version of the second generation of the Nissan Micra in Europe, which wasn't sold in the UK.

See also

 List of PSA engines

References

Sources
Guide des moteurs Peugeot Citroën (in French)

TU
TU
Straight-four engines
Diesel engines by model
Gasoline engines by model